The 2005–06 Netball Superleague season (known for sponsorship reasons as the figleaves.com Netball Superleague) was the inaugural season of the new Netball Superleague which replaced the Super Cup as the top level netball competition in England. The inaugural champions were Team Bath, who defeated Galleria Mavericks in the grand final.

Overview
The Netball Superleague replaced the Super Cup as the top level netball competition in England. Four of the six Super Cup teams – Brunel Hurricanes, Northern Thunder, Team Bath 
and Team Northumbria – were joined by four new teams – Celtic Dragons, Galleria Mavericks, Leeds Carnegie and Loughborough Lightning – to become the eight founder members of the Netball Superleague. The season started in October 2005 and was concluded in June 2006. Its main sponsor was figleaves.com. With a squad that included Pamela Cookey, Rachel Dunn, Stacey Francis, Jess Garland, Tamsin Greenway and Geva Mentor, Team Bath won the inaugural Netball Superleague title.

Teams

Grand final

References

 
2005-06
 
 
2005 in Welsh women's sport
2006 in Welsh women's sport